Jacci Gresham (born 1951) is the first known Black female tattoo artist in the United States. She is from Flint, Michigan, US. She has been based in New Orleans since 1976. Her shop, Aart Accent Tattoos & Body Piercing, is Louisiana's oldest continuous tattoo business. At the time of its opening, she was one of only five practicing female tattoo artists in the United States, and the only woman doing tattooing in New Orleans. In 2011, she was honored as a Pioneer of Female Tattoo Artists.

Early life and career 

Gresham enjoyed drawing as a child. In college, she studied architecture and engineering. After graduating, she began working for General Motors designing floor plans for car dealerships. At the age of 25, while working at an engineering firm, she met Ajit "Ali" Singh. Both later visited New Orleans in search of work, but were not successful. At the time, there were only two tattoo shops in New Orleans. Upon this discovery, Gresham and Singh then opened up what was then the third tattoo shop in New Orleans. When they opened this shop, Gresham had no experience, and did not even have a tattoo of her own. Subsequently the two existing shops have closed, making Aart Accent the oldest in New Orleans.

1950s - 1970s 

Between the 1950s-1970s, females in the tattoo industry were very scarce. Women only gained acceptance into tattoo shops if they were dating or married to one of the tattoo artists. In the early 1970s, Jacci Gresham became a pioneer of female tattoo artists who helped pave the way for the rise of other female artists entering the industry.

References 

1961 births
Living people
American tattoo artists
African-American artists
21st-century African-American people
20th-century African-American people